USS Regulus is a name used more than once by the United States Navy:

 , commissioned in ordinary 8 August 1940
 , launched 7 June 1944

United States Navy ship names